Leanne Smith (born May 8, 1988) is an American Paralympic swimmer who represented the United States at the 2020 Summer Paralympics.

Career
Smith represented the United States in the women's 100 metre freestyle S3 event and won a silver medal at the 2020 Summer Paralympics.

On April 14, 2022, Smith was named to the roster to represent the United States at the 2022 World Para Swimming Championships. At the World Championships, she won a gold medal in all seven events she participated in, to lead all swimmers in gold medals. Her seven gold medals were the most in a single championships by an American since Jessica Long also won seven gold medals in 2010.

References

1988 births
Living people
American female freestyle swimmers
Sportspeople from Beverly, Massachusetts
Medalists at the World Para Swimming Championships
Paralympic swimmers of the United States
Paralympic silver medalists for the United States
Paralympic medalists in swimming
Swimmers at the 2020 Summer Paralympics
Medalists at the 2020 Summer Paralympics
Swimmers from Massachusetts
21st-century American women
American female backstroke swimmers
American female breaststroke swimmers
American female medley swimmers
S3-classified Paralympic swimmers